Municipal elections were held in Port Vila to elect members of the Port Vila Municipal Council.

Although Namas Alfred of the Union of Moderate Parties won the most votes, they did not receive the most seats.

Voter turnout was just 50%.

References

Elections in Vanuatu